My Juan and Only is a Philippine comedy/drama series aired on ABS-CBN from May 28, 2005 to January 28, 2006, replacing StarDance and was replaced by Komiks.

Cast
Aaron Junatas as Juan the chubby little boy who have two fathers and one mother.
Ai-Ai delas Alas as Mercy, The mother of Juan.
Randy Santiago as Harry the husband of Mercy and The REAL Father of Juan.
Nova Villa as the grandmother of Beth and Sandra who doesn't like Henry nor Mercy.
John Prats as Henry, The Nephew of Mercy.
Toni Gonzaga as Beth an aspiring actress who starts her career as maid no. 2 in a teleserye.
Vhong Navarro as Ferdie the fake daddy of Juan, cousin of Harry, in love with Beth.
Paw Diaz as Sandra a nursing student/younger sister of Beth. Is deprived of the attention of her grandma because of her sister's "career". Is in-love with Henry.
Long Mejia as Attorney, a friend of Juan's family.
Nash Aguas Newtone, the geeky best friend of Juan who at first tries to explain to Juan that he cannot have two fathers and one mother.
Dagul as Corny, the bad guy of Juan.
Julijo Pisk as Rowan, the other bad guy of Juan.
Angelo Garcia as Darius, the only monster of Juan.
Andre Tiangco as Ramil Samaniego, guest who mistakenly thought that Juan was his own son.

See also
List of Philippine television shows

References

ABS-CBN drama series
ABS-CBN original programming
2005 Philippine television series debuts
2006 Philippine television series endings
Filipino-language television shows